Raed Ibrahim Saleh Haikal Al-Mukhaini (born 9 June 1992), commonly known as Raed Ibrahim Saleh, is an Omani footballer who plays for Dhofar Club.

Club career
Fanja SC

On 13 July 2013, he signed a contract with 2012–13 Oman Elite League runners-up Fanja SC. On 4 July 2014, he agreed a one-year contract extension with Fanja SC.

Valletta FC

On 14 July 2017, Saleh signed a 2 year contract with Maltese side, Valletta FC. Making his first move to European football.

Club career statistics

International career
National Team

Raed is part of the first team squad of the Oman national football team. He was selected for the national team for the first time in 2012. He made his first appearance for Oman on 11 September 2012 in a friendly match against Ireland. He has made appearances in the 2014 FIFA World Cup qualification, the 2013 Gulf Cup of Nations, the 2014 WAFF Championship and the 2015 AFC Asian Cup qualification.

National team career statistics

Goals for Senior National Team
Scores and results list Oman's goal tally first.

Honours

Club
With Al-Oruba
Oman Super Cup (1): 2011

With Fanja
Oman Professional League (0): Runner-up 2013-14
Sultan Qaboos Cup (1): 2013-14
Oman Professional League Cup (1): 2014-15
Oman Super Cup (0): Runner-up 2013, 2014

References

External links
 
 
 Raed Ibrahim Salehat Goal.com 
 
 
 Raed Ibrahim Saleh - ASIAN CUP Australia 2015

1992 births
Living people
People from Salalah
Omani footballers
Omani expatriate footballers
Oman international footballers
Association football midfielders
2015 AFC Asian Cup players
Al-Orouba SC players
Fanja SC players
Valletta F.C. players
Dhofar Club players
Maltese Premier League players
Oman Professional League players
2019 AFC Asian Cup players
Expatriate footballers in Malta